Delmadinone acetate (DMA), sold under the brand name Tardak among others, is a progestin and antiandrogen which is used in veterinary medicine to treat androgen-dependent conditions such as benign prostatic hyperplasia. It must be used with care as it has the potential to cause adrenal insufficiency via inhibition of adrenocorticotropic hormone (ACTH) secretion from the pituitary gland. DMA is the C17α acetate ester of delmadinone, which, in contrast to DMA, was never marketed for medical use.

Uses

Veterinary
DMA is used to treat androgen-dependent conditions in animals. It is most commonly used to treat benign prostatic hyperplasia. However, it can also be used to treat hypersexuality in male dogs and cats, perianal gland tumors in dogs, and hormone-driven aggression in dogs.

Pharmacology

Pharmacodynamics
DMA is a progestogen with antigonadotropic and hence antiandrogenic and antiestrogenic effects. In addition, DMA binds to the androgen receptor, and likely acts as an antagonist of this receptor similarly to related drugs like chlormadinone acetate and osaterone acetate.

Chemistry

DMA, also known as 1-dehydrochlormadinone acetate, as well as 1,6-didehydro-6-chloro-17α-acetoxyprogesterone or '6-chloro-17α-hydroxypregna-1,4,6-triene-3,20-dione, is a synthetic pregnane steroid and a derivative of progesterone. It is specifically a derivative of 17α-hydroxyprogesterone with a chlorine atom at the C6 position, a double bond between the C1 and C2 positions, another double bond between the C6 and C7 positions, and an acetate ester at the C17α position. Analogues of DMA include other 17α-hydroxyprogesterone derivatives such as chlormadinone acetate, cyproterone acetate, hydroxyprogesterone caproate, medroxyprogesterone acetate, megestrol acetate, and osaterone acetate.

History
DMA was first described in the literature in 1959 and has been marketed since at least 1972. It was marketed by this year in Europe and the United Kingdom under the brand names Tardak and Zenadrex. It was under development for use in the United States as well but does not seem to have ultimately been marketed in this country.

Society and culture

Generic names

Brand names
DMA is most commonly sold as Tardak, but has also been marketed under a variety of other brand names including Delmate, Estrex, Tardastren, Tardastrex, Vetadinon, and Zenadrex.

Availability
DMA is available in Europe and Oceania. It is specifically marketed in the United Kingdom, France, Belgium, Germany, Austria, Switzerland, the Netherlands, Finland, Australia, and New Zealand.

References

Acetate esters
Antiandrogen esters
Antigonadotropins
Chloroarenes
Conjugated dienes
Glucocorticoids
Enones
Pregnanes
Progestogen esters
Progestogens
Steroidal antiandrogens
Veterinary drugs